Seymour Joseph Cassel (January 22, 1935 – April 7, 2019) was an American actor who appeared in over 200 films and television shows, with a career spanning over 50 years. He first came to prominence in the 1960s in the pioneering independent films of writer/director John Cassavetes. The first of these was Too Late Blues (1961), followed by Faces (1968), for which he was nominated for an Academy Award and won a National Society of Film Critics Award. Cassel went on to appear in Cassavetes' Minnie and Moskowitz (1971), The Killing of a Chinese Bookie (1976), Opening Night (1977), and Love Streams (1984).
He also appeared in other notable films, including: Coogan's Bluff (1968), The Last Tycoon (1976), Valentino (1977), Convoy (1978), Johnny Be Good (1988), Mobsters (1991), In the Soup (1992), Honeymoon in Vegas (1992), Indecent Proposal (1993), Beer League (2006), and Fort McCoy (2011). Like Cassavetes, Wes Anderson frequently cast Cassel – first in Rushmore (1998), then in The Royal Tenenbaums (2001), and finally in The Life Aquatic with Steve Zissou (2004).

Early life
Cassel was born in Detroit, Michigan, the son of Pancretia Ann (née Kearney), a performer, and Seymour Joseph Cassel, a nightclub owner.

His mother was remarried to a master sergeant in the U.S. Army Air Forces, and the family moved to Panama, where Cassel's stepfather was said to have won a nightclub in a game of craps. After his mother filed for divorce in the late 1940s, she sent Seymour to live with his godmother in Detroit, where he soon joined a gang. He later said that at 17, he was given a choice: join the Navy, or go to jail. He picked the military, and after three years of service and a brief stint in college, he returned to Detroit, where he built props for a theater company and took small acting roles. Convinced he had a future in theater, he bought a bus ticket to New York, only to bomb at an Actors Studio audition.

Career

Cassel's early career was tied to fellow actor John Cassavetes, who was informally part of his clan of actors. He made his film debut in Cassavetes' first film, Shadows, on which he also served as associate producer. In 1961 he co-starred with Cassavetes in Too Late Blues and 1962's The Webster Boy.

Cassel also appeared in The Lloyd Bridges Show in the episode "A Pair of Boots", directed by his friend Cassavetes. Cassel appeared on such popular programs as Twelve O'Clock High, Combat!, and The F.B.I. He also appeared as "Cancelled", one of Colonel Gumm's henchmen in the 1960s Batman TV episode "A Piece of the Action", which also featured guest stars Van Williams and Bruce Lee as The Green Hornet and Kato, respectively.

In 1968, Cassel was nominated for the Academy Award for Best Supporting Actor for his role as Chet in John Cassavetes's Faces. Other collaborations with Cassavetes included a starring role with Gena Rowlands in Minnie and Moskowitz, supporting roles in The Killing of a Chinese Bookie and Love Streams, and a cameo appearance in Opening Night.

Cassel appeared in many major Hollywood productions such as Dick Tracy, Tin Men, and Indecent Proposal. He was also very supportive of the American independent film community, especially in the wake of Cassavetes's death. Cassel had a small role in Steve Buscemi's directorial debut Trees Lounge and appeared in three films by Wes Anderson: Rushmore, The Royal Tenenbaums and The Life Aquatic. Cassel appeared for four seasons on comedian Tracey Ullman's television series Tracey Takes On....

Personal life
Cassel married Elizabeth Deering in 1964; they had two children before divorcing in 1983.

Guitarist Slash, who was childhood friends with Cassel's son, credited Cassel with giving him his nickname, because he was "always zipping from one place to another and never sitting still."

Cassel died on April 7, 2019, aged 84, of Alzheimer's disease.

Accolades
In 2009, the San Diego Film Festival awarded the actor with the Indie Icon Award.

In September 2007, Cassel was a candidate for national president of the Screen Actors Guild, along with Charley M. De La Peña, Alan Rosenberg (incumbent), and Barry Simmonds.

In 2009, Cassel was once again a candidate for national president of the Screen Actors Guild along with Anne Marie Johnson and Ken Howard. Howard was the eventual winner.

In 2012, the Oldenburg Film Festival in Germany introduced an actors' prize named the Seymour Cassel Award.

He won the National Society of Film Critics Awards, USA award for Best Supporting Actor for his role in Faces.

Filmography

Film

Television

References

External links 

 
 Interview with the Palisadian-Post

1935 births
2019 deaths
American male film actors
American male television actors
Male actors from Detroit
Sundance Film Festival award winners
Deaths from Alzheimer's disease
Deaths from dementia in California
21st-century American male actors
20th-century American male actors
20th-century American Jews
21st-century American Jews